Khodeza Azam was a Bangladeshi civil servant who served as  Secretary of Ministry of Social Welfare from 15 September 1994 to 1 February 1995. She died on 14 February 2014 at the age of 76.

References 

2014 deaths
Bangladeshi civil servants
People from Pabna District